Dähne or Daehne is a German surname. Notable people with the surname include:
Heike Dähne (born 1961), German former swimmer
Helmut Dähne (born 1944), German former motorcycle racer
Paul-Heinrich Dähne (1921–1945), German Luftwaffe military aviator
Sabine Dähne (born 1950), German rower
Thomas Dähne (born 1994), German footballer who plays as a goalkeeper

Surnames of German origin

German-language surnames